Lady Eleanor Holles Boat Club is a rowing club on the River Thames, based at the Millennium Boat House, Lower Sunbury Road, Hampton, London. The club belongs to Lady Eleanor Holles School.

History
In 2000 the club's Millennium Boathouse was opened 2 km upstream from Molesey weir, close to the upstream end of Platts Eyot. The land it was built on was originally owned by Thames Water and construction of the boathouse was a joint project with the Hampton School Boat Club and the two schools form the Hampton and the Holles Boat Club Association. In 2000 the boathouse was opened by Sir Steve Redgrave and Ann Redgrave.

The club has produced multiple British champions.

Honours

British champions

National Schools' Regatta

References

Rowing clubs in England
Rowing clubs of the River Thames
Hampton, London
Scholastic rowing in the United Kingdom